Inés María Jhonson Peña (born 10 December 1989) is an Ecuadorian footballer who plays as a midfielder for Deportivo Cuenca. She was a member of the Ecuador women's national team.

International career
Jhonson capped for Ecuador during the 2014 Copa América Femenina.

References

1989 births
Living people
Women's association football midfielders
Ecuadorian women's footballers
Sportspeople from Guayaquil
Ecuador women's international footballers
C.D. Cuenca Femenino players
Ecuadorian women's futsal players
21st-century Ecuadorian women